Ascension Parish School Board is a school district headquartered in Donaldsonville, Louisiana, United States.

The district serves Ascension Parish.

Ascension Parish Public Schools (K-12)

Primary schools
 Bluff Ridge Primary School (K-5) (Prairieville, La)
Bullion primary (K-5) (Gonzales, Louisiana)
 G.W. Carver Primary School (K-5) (Gonzales, Louisiana)
 Central Primary School (K-5) (Gonzales, Louisiana)
 Donaldsonville Primary School (EC-2) (Donaldsonville, Louisiana)
 Duplessis Primary School (K-5) (Gonzales, Louisiana)
 Dutchtown Primary School (K-5) (Geismar, Louisiana)
 Galvez Primary School (K-5) (Prairieville, Louisiana)
 Gonzales Primary School (K-5) (Gonzalez, Louisiana)
 Lakeside Primary School (K-5) (Prairieville, Louisiana)
 Oak Grove Primary School (K-5) (Prairieville, Louisiana)
 Pecan Grove Primary School (K-5) (Gonzales, Louisiana)
 Prairieville Primary School (K-5) (Prairieville, Louisiana)
 St. Amant Primary School (K-5) (St. Amant, Louisiana)
 Spanish Lake Primary School (K-5) (Geismar, Louisiana)
 Sorrento Primary School (K-5) (Sorrento, Louisiana)
 Sugar Mill Primary School (K-5) (Prairieville, La)

K-8 schools
 Lake Elementary School (K-8) (St. Amant, Louisiana)
 Lowery Elementary school (3-5) (Donaldsonville, La)

Middle schools
 Central Middle School (Gonzales, Louisiana) (6-8)
 Dutchtown Middle School (6-8) (Geismar, Louisiana)
 Galvez Middle School (6-8) (Prairieville, Louisiana)
 Gonzales Middle School (6-8)(Gonzales, Louisiana)
 Lowery Middle School (6-8) (Donaldsonville, Louisiana)
 Prairieville Middle School (6-8) (Prairieville, Louisiana)
 St. Amant Middle School (6-8) (St. Amant, Louisiana)
 Bluff Middle School (6-8) (Prairieville, La)

High schools
 Dutchtown High School (9-12) (Geismar, Louisiana)
 East Ascension High School (9-12) (Gonzales, Louisiana)
 St. Amant High School (9-12) (St. Amant, Louisiana)
 Donaldsonville High School (9-12) (Donaldsonville, Louisiana)

Other schools/facilities
 LeBlanc Special Services (Special Education) (Gonzales, Louisiana)
 Ascension Head Start (Program for Ages 3 to 4) (Donaldsonville, Louisiana)
 Ascension Alternative School (Alternative Program) (Darrow, Louisiana)
 Title I Office (Federal Programs) (Darrow, Louisiana)

Past board members
Melvin Irvin, board member 1972–1983; president, 1976–1978; state representative, 1984-1992

References

External links

 Ascension Parish School Board

School districts in Louisiana
Education in Ascension Parish, Louisiana